USS Sawfish (SS-276), a , was a ship of the United States Navy named for the sawfish, a viviparous ray which has a long flat snout with a row of toothlike structures along each edge. It is found principally in the mouths of tropical American and African rivers.

Construction and commissioning
Sawfish was laid down on 20 January 1942 by the Portsmouth Navy Yard at Kittery, Maine; launched on 23 June 1942; sponsored by Hattie Wyatt Caraway, the first woman to be elected to the United States Senate; and commissioned on 26 August 1942.

Service history

World War II
After shakedown off Portsmouth, New Hampshire, in Narragansett Bay, and en route to the Panama Canal, Sawfish arrived at Pearl Harbor, Hawaii, on 21 January 1943. Ten days later, she got underway for the first of her 10 war patrols.

First and second war patrols, January–June 1943 

Sawfish proceeded to waters off southwestern Japan where she attacked several targets and concluded that she had sunk or damaged some. However, it turned out that she had mistakenly sunk two neutral Soviet cargo ships, Kola on 16 February 1943 and Ilmen on 17 February. A careful study of Japanese and American records after the war did not confirm any other sinkings on Sawfishs first war patrol, which ended when she reached Midway Atoll in the Northwestern Hawaiian Islands on 25 March 1943.

The submarine departed Midway on 15 April and headed for Japan. On 5 May off the coast of Honshū, she sank the converted gunboat, Hakkai Maru. A fortnight later, she stalked an enemy task force but lost her quarry in heavy swells. She returned to Pearl Harbor on 6 June.

Third war patrol, June–August 1943 

Underway again on the last day of the month, Sawfish set course for the East China Sea. On the night of 21 July, she attacked convoy Hi-3 of nine ships and concluded that she had scored several hits. However, postwar assessment of records was unable to confirm any kills during this attack or during her operations for the next five days.

Finally, early on the morning of 27 July, her luck changed when she attacked a convoy escorted by a 720-ton minelayer. Comdr. Sands fired a spread of four torpedoes from a range of only . He went deep as soon as the “fish” were clear and, in less than half a minute, the submarine was jolted by a violent explosion. Fearing that the detonation had been premature, Sands remained deep for over an hour. When he ascended to periscope depth, the convoy had escaped, but the escort, coastal minelayer, Hirashima, was sinking. Sawfish returned to Pearl Harbor on 10 August.

Fourth and fifth war patrols, September–December 1943 

During her fourth patrol, 10 September to 16 October, defective torpedoes frustrated the seven attacks which she made in the Sea of Japan before she returned to Midway. She got underway for the Bonins and her fifth patrol on 1 November. On 8 December, she sank 3,267-ton passenger-cargo ship, Sansei Maru, and returned to Midway on 19 December. She soon proceeded to Hunter's Point Navy Yard, San Francisco, California, for overhaul.

Sixth and seventh war patrols, April–August 1944 

Back in top trim, the submarine returned to Pearl Harbor early in the spring. On 8 April 1944, she got underway for Japanese waters and her sixth war patrol. However, she only encountered two targets: a cargo ship which she attacked on 25 April and a second vessel which she sighted four days later—too fast and too far away for the submarine to attack. Although the submarine reported scoring two hits on the cargo ship, Japanese records contain no evidence of any sinking in the vicinity of the attack.

The submarines sortied from Majuro on 22 June and headed for the Philippines. On 18 July, she damaged a tanker and, on 26 July, fired a spread of four torpedoes at surfaced Japanese submarine  (one of only six Axis powers submarines to attempt trans-oceanic Yanagi missions), which exploded and sank. After a fruitless chase of a large Japanese convoy, the wolfpack ended the patrol at Pearl Harbor on 15 August.

Eighth war patrol, September–November 1944 

During Sawfish'''s eighth war patrol, her commanding officer, Comdr. Alan B. Banister, led a wolfpack which included ,  and from time to time other submarines. The pack departed Pearl Harbor on 9 September and headed for waters south of Formosa where the submarines took a heavy toll on enemy shipping. Sawfish, herself, accounted for a 6,521-ton tanker, Tachibana Maru, on 9 October and a 6,838-ton seaplane tender, on 23 October.

During the patrol, Sawfish also served on lifeguard station off Formosa in support of carrier raids. On 16 October, she rescued a pilot from VF-15 of ) who had survived four and one-half days at sea in a small rubber boat without food, water, or sunshade. The wolfpack returned to Majuro on 8 November.

 Ninth and tenth war patrols, December 1944–April 1945 Sawfish got underway on 17 December 1944 and returned to waters off Formosa where she spent her entire ninth war patrol on lifeguard station. She rescued a pilot on 21 January 1945 before heading toward Guam. She reached Apra Harbor on 4 February for refit.Sawfish sailed on 10 March for her 10th and last war patrol, which she spent on lifeguard station off Nansei Shoto supporting air strikes preparing for and covering the conquest of Okinawa. She returned to Pearl Harbor on 26 April and soon proceeded to San Francisco for overhaul in the Bethlehem Steel Company yard there.

 Post-World War II Sawfish was heading toward Hawaii on 15 August 1945 when hostilities ended. She reached Pearl Harbor on 22 August but soon headed back to the west coast for duty as a training ship for the West Coast Fleet Sound School. She returned to Hawaii early in 1946, but was back at San Francisco on 22 March for inactivation. She was decommissioned on 26 June 1946 and remained in reserve at Mare Island Naval Shipyard until May 1947 when she proceeded to San Pedro for duty as a Naval Reserve training ship. On 1 April 1960, Sawfish was stricken from the Navy List and scrapped.

Honors and awardsSawfish received eight battle stars for service during World War II.

In popular culture
 USS Sawfish is credited in the 1957–58 television series The Silent Service as the platform for the film sequences.
 USS Sawfish portrayed the fictional submarine USS Moray'' in the Season 3 Episode 23 episode of Perry Mason, "The Case of the Slandered Submarine" (1960).

References

Citations

Bibliography
 Hinman, Charles R., and Douglas E. Campbell. The Submarine Has No Friends: Friendly Fire Incidents Involving U.S. Submarines During World War II. Syneca Research Group, Inc., 2019. .

External links 
 history.navy.mil: USS Sawfish
 hazegray.org: USS Sawfish
 navsource.org: USS Sawfish
 Kill record: USS Sawfish

 

Gato-class submarines
World War II submarines of the United States
Ships built in Kittery, Maine
1942 ships
Maritime incidents in February 1943
Friendly fire incidents of World War II